Goodwin Square is a 30-story,  skyscraper located at 225 Asylum Street in Downtown Hartford, Connecticut. The Goodwin Square complex includes the office tower that bears its name, as well as the adjoining Goodwin Hotel. The tower itself is the third tallest building in Hartford and in Connecticut.

After foreclosure in 2013, Goodwin Square entered a period of limbo before being bought by a Wilton-based real estate firm in May 2015. Westport Capital Partners, which together with two co-investors bought the building in an online auction for $17.6 million.

See also
Goodwin Hotel
List of tallest buildings in Hartford
List of tallest buildings by U.S. state

References

Skyscraper office buildings in Connecticut
Skyscrapers in Hartford, Connecticut
Skidmore, Owings & Merrill buildings